Henrietta McBrayer Buckler Seiberling (March 18, 1888 – December 5, 1979) was a member of a Christian fellowship group named the Oxford Group. She and others of the Oxford group helped found Alcoholics Anonymous.

Early life 
Born in Lawrenceburg, Kentucky to Judge Julius A. and Mary Maddox Buckler, Seiberling spent her childhood in El Paso and San Antonio, Texas. A gifted pianist, she attend Vassar College where she earned an A.B. degree with a major in music and a minor in psychology. She met John Fredrick "Fred" Seiberling, a lieutenant in the Ohio National Guard, while he was deployed to El Paso. The couple married in 1917 in Akron, Ohio, and had three children.

Career 
Though Seiberling herself was not an alcoholic, she believed as a Christian that it was her responsibility to solve social problems. Seiberling began the “alcoholic squad" of the Oxford Group Movement. In their first case, Dr. Bob Smith admitted that he was a secret drinker, marking the first time the Akron Oxford Group prayed together to help someone through alcoholism. Although the majority of the Seiberling family were members at a Lutheran church near their house, she was not. Seiberling was more of a "student of the bible," rather than a "church-goer."

The Oxford Group came along when Henrietta's marriage to Fredrick Seiberling was crumbling. Her daughter Dorothy said that "It gave her a new focus, and helped her see that there was more to life than marital problems." Henrietta grew closer to Bob and Anne Smith, and would call Anne everyday to talk about the comfort they both received through the Oxford Group. The Oxford Group's beliefs inspired some of the early practices of Alcoholics Anonymous as founded by Bill W. and Dr. Bob Smith among others. Henrietta Seiberling and her husband were devoted supporters of Alcoholics Anonymous, opening their home to its members and also leading meetings of the Oxford Group for those who were interested.

Personal life 
Her son, John F. Seiberling, was a Representative in the United States Congress from Ohio and a member of the Democratic party. Seiberling also had 2 daughters, Mary S. Huhn and Dorothy Seiberling Steinberg, who was a deputy editor for the New York Times Magazine.

Death and legacy 
Seiberling died in New York City on December 5, 1979. She is buried next to her parents in Lawrenceburg, Kentucky. On her gravestone is an inscription familiar to both the Oxford Group people and to the fellowship of Alcoholics Anonymous: "Let Go and Let God."

References

1888 births
1979 deaths
People from Lawrenceburg, Kentucky
Vassar College alumni
Alcoholics Anonymous
Ohio National Guard personnel
Seiberling family